The Apotheosis of Catherine of Braganza is a ceiling painting by Antonio Verrio, at Windsor Castle.  It is one of three that survived, of the original twenty, mostly destroyed during George IV's nineteenth century reconstruction of the castle.

The painting
The painting depicts Catherine of Braganza, the wife of Charles II, seated under a billowing canopy, and surrounded by allegorical figures.

It is located in the Queen's Presence Chamber in Windsor Castle.

The subject

The artist

Reception

References

External links
 The Royal Collections

Paintings in Windsor Castle
Paintings by Antonio Verrio
Cultural depictions of Catherine of Braganza